Ageratina viburnoides is a species of plant in the family Asteraceae.

Etymology
Ageratina is derived from Greek meaning 'un-aging', in reference to the flowers keeping their color for a long time. This name was used by Dioscorides for a number of different plants.

References

 Phytologia 19 227 1970.
 JSTOR

viburnoides